Efraín Arizmendi Uribe (born 18 December 1961) is a Mexican politician from the National Action Party. From 2006 to 2009 he served as Deputy of the LX Legislature of the Mexican Congress representing Guerrero.

References

1961 births
Living people
Politicians from Guerrero
National Action Party (Mexico) politicians
21st-century Mexican politicians
Autonomous University of Guerrero alumni
Academic staff of Universidad Autónoma Metropolitana
Academic staff of the Instituto Politécnico Nacional
Academic staff of the National Autonomous University of Mexico
20th-century Mexican physicians
Mexican cardiologists
Deputies of the LX Legislature of Mexico
Members of the Chamber of Deputies (Mexico) for Guerrero